Brian Coleman (born 1961) is a British Conservative Party politician. 

Brian Coleman may also refer to:

 Brian Coleman (footballer, born 1932) (1932–1966), Essendon VFL footballer
 Brian Coleman (footballer, born 1935), former Hawthorn VFL footballer

See also
Bryan Coleman (1911–2005), English film and television actor